The Flemington Historic District is a historic district in Flemington, Hunterdon County, New Jersey, United States.
After evaluation by the state historic preservation office (SHPO) it was listed on New Jersey Register of Historic Places (NJRHP #1587)) and the National Register of Historic Places (NRHP #80002493) in 1980. One has been documented by the Historic American Buildings Survey (HABS).

Among the contributing properties (CP) are:
 Union Hotel - Early 19th century hotel in downtown Flemington that served as a restaurant until its 2008 closure. The current structure dates to 1877, built on the site of what had been a stagecoach stop that dates to 1814.
 Hunterdon County Courthouse - Historic court house where the Lindbergh Trial took place. Now used for County offices.
 Fleming Castle / Samuel Fleming House - First house in Flemington, 5 Bonnell Street. Purchased by the Borough of Flemington in 2005 and operated as a historical museum by the Friends of Fleming Castle.

See also
National Register of Historic Places listings in Hunterdon County, New Jersey

References

Flemington, New Jersey
National Register of Historic Places in Hunterdon County, New Jersey
Historic districts on the National Register of Historic Places in New Jersey